The Espada Acequia, or Piedras Creek Aqueduct, was built by Franciscan friars in 1731 in what is now San Antonio, Texas, United States.  It was built to supply irrigation water to the lands near Mission San Francisco de la Espada, today part of San Antonio Missions National Historical Park. The acequia is still in use today and is an National Historic Civil Engineering Landmark and a National Historic Landmark.

Irrigation system

Mission Espada's acequia (irrigation) system can still be seen today. The main ditch, or acequia madre, continues to carry water to the mission and its former farmlands. This water is still used by residents living on these neighboring lands.

The initial survival of a new mission depended upon the planting and harvesting of crops. In south central Texas, intermittent rainfall and the need for a reliable water source made the design and installation of an acequia system a high priority. Irrigation was so important to Spanish colonial settlers that they measured cropland in suertes -the amount of land that could be watered in one day.

The use of acequias was originally brought to the arid regions of Spain by the Romans and the Moors. When Franciscan missionaries arrived in the desert Southwest they found the system worked well in the hot, dry environment. In some areas, like New Mexico, it blended in easily with the irrigation system already in use by the Puebloan Native Americans.

The acequia not only conducted potable water and irrigation, but also powered a mill.

Mission Espada has survived from its beginnings to the present day as a community center that still supports a Catholic parish and religious education, however a school originally opened by the Sisters of the Incarnate Word and Blessed Sacrament was closed in 1967.

References

External links

Buildings and structures in San Antonio
History of San Antonio
National Historic Landmarks in Texas
National Register of Historic Places in San Antonio
Historic American Buildings Survey in Texas
Historic American Engineering Record in Texas
Irrigation projects
Irrigation in the United States
Water supply infrastructure on the National Register of Historic Places
Historic Civil Engineering Landmarks
Spanish missions in Texas
Colonial United States (Spanish)
San Antonio Missions National Historical Park
1730s in Texas
1731 establishments in the Spanish Empire
Individually listed contributing properties to historic districts on the National Register in Texas